The Intimate Theatre was a repertory theatre in Palmers Green, London from 1937 to 1987, and is the name commonly used for St. Monica's Church Hall.

History
St. Monica's Church Hall was built in 1931, and the actor John Clements turned the building into the Intimate Theatre in 1935. It became a full-time professional repertory theatre in 1937.

After he was demobbed, Roger Moore was a member of the repertory company, and earned about £10 per week. In the late 1940s, the BBC televised 14 plays from the theatre.

During the 1960s, the repertory company put on a new play each week, although Max Rietmann's Hot and Cold in all Rooms played to a capacity audience for three weeks in 1962.

In March 1968, David Bowie acted the role of Cloud in Lindsay Kemp's Pierrot In Turquoise at the theatre.

In August 1968 Richard Todd starred in Man with a Load of Mischief with Dilys Laye.

In 1969, the building reverted for a short time to its use as a church hall before returning to its use as a theatre.

In 1987, the usage as a theatre was reduced to allow the church to hold other events.

Current use
It has a current capacity of 435 Today (2012) the theatre was used by Protos Theatre & Arts Group, The London Pantomimers,  Acorn Theatre Company, Saint Monica's Players, and other amateur drama groups. It is located on Green Lanes. In January 2019, it was placed on the Heritage at Risk Register after the church owners said they wanted to demolish the building to replace it with a new parish hall.

Building scheduled for demolition
On 8 March, Enfield Council's Planning Committee voted unanimously to grant planning permission to the redevelopment scheme.

References

Further reading
 Intimate Memories: The History of the Intimate Theatre, Palmers Green by Geoff Bowden, Badger Press, 2006 

Theatres in the London Borough of Enfield
Theatres completed in 1931
Palmers Green
Structures on the Heritage at Risk register in London
Roman Catholic churches in the City of Westminster